Dirichletia virgata, synonym Placopoda virgata, is a species of plant in the family Rubiaceae. It is endemic to Yemen.  Its natural habitats are subtropical or tropical dry forests and subtropical or tropical dry shrubland.

References
 

Endemic flora of Socotra
Least concern plants
Taxonomy articles created by Polbot